Charles Ayoub is a Lebanese journalist and businessman that is the editor in chief and owner of Ad-Diyar, an Arabic-language daily newspaper published in Lebanon. known for his pro-Syrian stance. He was formerly a member of the Syrian Social Nationalist Party in Lebanon, and a candidate for Lebanese parliament in 1972 and 2009.

References 

Lebanese journalists
Lebanese Christians
Year of birth missing (living people)
Living people